The current Marquis of Valdecarzana is Fernando de Balmaseda y Queralt.

External links
 https://web.archive.org/web/20080205023922/http://www.blasoneshispanos.com/Genealogia/ElencoDeNobleza/TitulosNobiliarosV.htm

Spanish noble titles
Noble titles created in 1637